cryptlib is an open-source cross-platform software security toolkit library. It is distributed under the Sleepycat License, a free software license compatible with the GNU General Public License. Alternatively, cryptlib is available under a proprietary license for those preferring to use it under proprietary terms.

Features
cryptlib is a security toolkit library that allows programmers to incorporate encryption and authentication services to software. It provides a high-level interface so strong security capabilities can be added to an application without needing to know many of the low-level details of encryption or authentication algorithms. It comes with an over 400 page programming manual.

At the highest level, cryptlib provides implementations of complete security services such as S/MIME and PGP/OpenPGP secure enveloping, SSL/TLS and SSH secure sessions, CA services such as CMP, SCEP, RTCS, and OCSP, and other security operations such as secure timestamping. Since cryptlib uses industry-standard X.509, S/MIME, PGP/OpenPGP, and SSH/SSL/TLS data formats, the resulting encrypted or signed data can be easily transported to other systems and processed there, and cryptlib itself runs on many operating systems—all Windows versions and most Unix/Linux systems. This allows email, files, and EDI transactions to be authenticated with digital signatures and encrypted in an industry-standard format.

cryptlib provides other capabilities including full X.509/PKIX certificate handling (all X.509 versions from X.509v1 to X.509v4) with support for SET, Microsoft AuthentiCode, Identrus, SigG, S/MIME, SSL, and Qualified certificates, PKCS #7 certificate chains, handling of certification requests and CRLs (certificate revocation lists) including automated checking of certificates against CRLs and online checking using RTCS and OCSP, and issuing and revoking certificates using CMP and SCEP. It also implements a full range of certification authority (CA) functions provides complete CMP, SCEP, RTCS, and OCSP server implementations to handle online certificate enrolment/issue/revocation and certificate status checking. Alongside the certificate handling, it provides a sophisticated key storage interface that allows the use of a wide range of key database types ranging from PKCS #11 devices, PKCS #15 key files, and PGP/OpenPGP key rings through to commercial-grade RDBMS' and LDAP directories with optional SSL protection.

cryptlib can make use of the crypto capabilities of a variety of external crypto devices such as hardware crypto accelerators, Fortezza cards, PKCS #11 devices, hardware security modules (HSMs), and crypto smart cards. It can be used with a variety of crypto devices that have received FIPS 140 or ITSEC/Common Criteria certification. The crypto device interface also provides a general-purpose plug-in capability for adding new functionality that can be used by cryptlib.

cryptlib is written in C and supports BeOS, DOS, IBM MVS, Mac OS X, OS/2, Tandem, a variety of Unix versions (including AIX, Digital Unix, DGUX, FreeBSD/NetBSD/OpenBSD, HP-UX, IRIX, Linux, MP-RAS, OSF/1, QNX, SCO/UnixWare, Solaris, SunOS, Ultrix, and UTS4), VM/CMS, Windows 3.x, Windows 95/98/ME, Windows CE/PocketPC/SmartPhone and Windows NT/2000/XP/Vista. It is designed to be portable to other embedded system environments. It is available as a standard Windows DLL. Language bindings are available for C / C++, C# / .NET, Delphi, Java, Python, and Visual Basic (VB).

Algorithm support

Release History

See also

OpenSSL
GnuTLS
Network Security Services
Libgcrypt
MatrixSSL
mbed TLS (previously PolarSSL)
wolfSSL (previously CyaSSL)
Comparison of TLS implementations
Comparison of cryptography libraries

References

External links

Cryptlib - Encryption Security Software Development Toolkit by Digital Data Security Limited

Cryptographic software
C (programming language) libraries
Free security software
Cross-platform software
OpenPGP
Transport Layer Security implementation
1995 software